Marilyn Jane Aschner (born March 8, 1948) is an American former professional tennis player. She was an Orange Bowl doubles champion in 1966, and she won a gold medal at the 1969 Maccabiah Games in Israel in doubles with partner Julie Heldman. She made the third round in women's doubles of the 1966 U.S. National Championships and 1968 Wimbledon Championships.

Biography
A left-handed player from New York, Aschner lived in Holliswood, Queens and Jamaica, Queens. Aschner, who is Jewish, was active on tour in the 1960s and 1970s. She played high school tennis for Jamaica High School in Jamaica, Queens, New York. She played collegiate tennis for Queens College while studying for a sociology degree.

She was an Orange Bowl doubles champion in 1966. She made the women's doubles third round of both the 1966 U.S. National Championships and 1968 Wimbledon Championships.

At the 1965 Maccabiah Games in Israel, she was defeated in women's singles by South African Esmé Emmanuel, who won the silver medal.

She won a gold medal at the 1969 Maccabiah Games in doubles with partner Julie Heldman. Aschner also competed in women's singles, where she was defeated in the quarterfinals by Esmé Emmanuel.

Aschner taught tennis for many years at the Port Washington Tennis Academy in Port Washington, New York.

References

External links
 
 

1948 births
Living people
American female tennis players
Tennis people from New York (state)
Maccabiah Games medalists in tennis
Maccabiah Games gold medalists for the United States
Competitors at the 1965 Maccabiah Games
Competitors at the 1969 Maccabiah Games
People from Jamaica, Queens
People from Port Washington, New York
Sportspeople from Queens, New York
Queens College, City University of New York alumni
Queens Knights athletes
Jewish tennis players
Jewish American sportspeople